Roman Vladimirovich Rurua (born 25 November 1942) is a retired featherweight Greco-Roman wrestler from Georgia. He competed for the Soviet Union at the 1964 and 1968 Summer Olympics and won a silver and a gold medal, respectively. Between 1966 ad 1970 he was undefeated internationally and won four consecutive world titles. At the 1971 World Championships he injured his back and placed sixth. Domestically, he won Soviet titles in different weight divisions in 1963–1965, 1967, 1970 and 1971. In 1972 he retired from competitions, graduated from Georgian Polytechnic Institute, and started to work as an engineer. In 1988 he co-founded the political organization Sporting Georgia, and in 1999–2003 was a member of Parliament of Georgia. Rurua also served as vice-president of the Georgian Wrestling Federation and was inducted into the FILA International Wrestling Hall of Fame in 2010.

References

1942 births
Living people
People from Samegrelo-Zemo Svaneti
Soviet male sport wrestlers
Olympic wrestlers of the Soviet Union
Wrestlers at the 1964 Summer Olympics
Wrestlers at the 1968 Summer Olympics
Male sport wrestlers from Georgia (country)
Olympic gold medalists for the Soviet Union
Olympic silver medalists for the Soviet Union
Olympic medalists in wrestling
World Wrestling Championships medalists
Medalists at the 1968 Summer Olympics
Medalists at the 1964 Summer Olympics
Honoured Masters of Sport of the USSR

Recipients of the Presidential Order of Excellence